Telkom Vocational School  or SMK Telkom Medan  is a vocational school with Telecommunication and Information Engineering vocational program under the auspices of Sandhykara Putra Telkom Foundation. SMK Telkom is categorized as an international school and has an ISO 9001 standard. SMK Telkom Medan become The Best Vocational School in Medan or one of the Best Schools in Indonesia. The accreditation score of this school is nearly perfect (100), with score of 97 in Switching Engineering program and 95 on the Computer and Network Engineering program.

Telkom Vocational School (Medan)  has been working with Cisco Systems to follow the Cisco Networking Academy Program and to produce graduates who have International Certification of CCNA.

This school is located in Jamin Ginting Street No. 9C, 11,1 km from the center of Medan. The location is near Pancur Batu City, North Sumatera and near tourism area, such as Greenhill and Hairos.

Vocational school in Indonesia 
Vocational school in Indonesia could be considered as high school with special focused courses. Because, in Indonesian vocational school, they still have the same must-learned subjects with the general high school. So, that is why some vocational school could have opportunity to continue their study to the college.

History 
Telkom Vocational School Medan  was established in 1992, with the name of SMK Telkom Sandhy Putra Medan (Indonesian) and "Sandhy Putra Telecommunication Vocational School" (English). This school become the first vocational school in Indonesia which held a vocational education in the field of Telecommunication Engineering Program. Established by Telkom Sandhykara Putra Foundation whose owned by Indonesian Telecommunication Company, Telkom Indonesia. Telkom Sandhy Putra Vocational School Medan also simultaneously established in another city. Such as Jakarta, Bandung, Malang, Purwekerto and Banjarbaru.

There are four departments:
 Switching Engineering program
 Computer and Network Engineering
 Software Engineering
 Multimedia

In 2007, SMK Telkom Sandhy Putra Medan become the first International vocational school

In 2014, the school was renamed by the foundation and become SMK Telkom Medan (Indonesian) or Telkom Vocational School (English)

Curriculum 
Its main curriculum follows Indonesian vocational school curriculum and Indonesian International Curriculum as known as Kurikulum RSBI (Rintisan Sekolah Bertaraf Internasional). Students are divided by the expertise according to the result of their interest and aptitude test and psychological test before enroll learning progress. Cisco Networking Academy is also implemented for addition of world class academy program. Telkom Vocational School is the only school which conduct Installation Fiber Optic in Sumatera.

Expertise and skills of graduates of each expertise 
The study program has the goal of preparing students to enter the workforce and develop professionalism.

Switching Engineering 
Students will be able to operate the STDI device, install and maintain PABX devices and able to follow the development of telecommunications technologies (Softswitch, STB). Outside of Java island, this program is only available in this school.

Computer and Networks Engineering 
Students will be able to install and maintain PCs, create a network computer, and be Computer Technicians and Network Technicians.

Software Engineering 
Students will be educated in software development, maintenance, and management.

Multimedia 
Students will have knowledge of web development, game development, production, media and advertising. They will be able to use the computer to present and combine text, sound, images, animation, and video.

Organization 
Board of Trustees "Sandhykara Putra Telkom Foundation :
Directors. TELKOM (the Company)
Protector :
Chairman of the Board of Trustees "Sandhykara Putra Telkom Foundation" in London
Management Schools (ISO 9001 Standard :
Principal : Ir. Januar

Student life
Most of the students come from other regions, but this school is not boarding school. This school is surrounded by many boarding rooms, so the students could live there independently.

Student board organizations

Leadership, volunteer and survivalist

Religious organization

Sports 
Basketball, futsal, volleyball, Taekwondo, badminton, softball and baseball. The Futsal team is named by Neax FC. Each year, the manager of Neax FC holds an event which named by Neax Competition. The Futsal competition is reserved for Telkom Sandhy Putra's students. Neax Competition is contesting between a class to other class in Futsal. Taekwondo is the only martial art club in the school.

Arts 
Theater
It was named by Semut Teater and established in April 2009.  Semut Teater holds a theater festival by inviting theater clubs from other schools.
Choir
Traditional dance
The club specializes in Sumatera area. Traditional dances are performed in school events.  
Modern Dance
This club has three groups:
Lakers Dancer
Focused on modern dance, using electronic music or DJ music adapted from the USA.
New Flash Crew
Combines some kinds of modern dance, adapted from many other countries. 
Wotagei
Wotagei is a group dance adapted from Japan. The group dancing in the glow and using light stick when modern Japanese music is played.

Outdoor facilities
 Mosque
 Badminton Arena
 Volley Area
 Basketball Arena
 Futsal Field
 Music Studio
 Food Court
 Vehicle Parking
 Hostel

Achievements 
The total number of awards of Telkom Sandhy Putra Vocational School reached more than 170 posts, either in the form of a trophy, a plaque. And since July 2011 until presents, Telkom Sandhy Putra Vocational School has collected 44 achievement 
Levels.

Dominant achievement category:
City championship:
English Competition (Speech, Story Telling, Scrabble))
 Indonesian Debate
Paskibraka
Modern Dance
Futsal
Provincial championship:
Theater
English Debate
Taekwondo
Softball & Baseball
Olympic Applied Science Technology
National championship:
Basketball
Vocational Students Skills Competition in Information Technology and Communication

Notes and references

See also 

 Vocational School
 Private School
 ISO 9001
 CCNA
 Education in Indonesia
 List of schools in Indonesia

Other Links 

@ESA_Telkom(ESA di SMK TELKOM)on Twitter

SMK TELKOM Medan sends seven students to German

Telkom Akses Co. recruit fifty graduates students of SMK Telkom Sandhy Medan Putra (2013)

Full

https://groups.yahoo.com/neo/groups/ada_ubi_ada_talas/conversations/topics/402/ FFA Road to School: 
SMK Telkom Sandy Putra Medan played Teenagers production Film

Miliki Jurusan yang tidak diajarkan di SMK Lain

Telkom Sandhy Putra Medan give Entrepreneurship lesson to their students

International schools in Indonesia
Schools in Indonesia
Private schools
Buildings and structures in Medan
Education in North Sumatra